Rook or rooks may refer to:

Animals
Rook (bird) (Corvus frugilegus), a bird of the corvid family

Games
Rook (chess), a piece in chess
Rook (card game), a trick-taking card game

Military
Sukhoi Su-25 or Rook, a close air support aircraft
USS Rooks (DD-804), a destroyer launched in 1944

Places
Montes Rook, a mountain range on the Moon
Rooks County, Kansas

Fictional entities
The Rook (comics), a comic book character from Eerie magazine
Rook (G.I. Joe), a character in the G.I. Joe universe
Rook, an Utrom in Teenage Mutant Ninja Turtles season 4
Rook Blonko, a character in Ben 10: Omniverse

Other uses
Rook (album), 2008 album by Shearwater
The Rook (novel), a 2011 supernatural thriller by Daniel O'Malley
The Rook (TV series), a TV series on Starz
Rook (piercing), a piercing on the anti-helix of the ear
Rook (rocket), a British rocket launched between 1959 and 1972
Rook (surname)
Qolla l-Bajda Battery or Rook, a discothèque in Żebbuġ, Gozo, Malta
Rook, an 1874 South Devon Railway 0-4-0 locomotive

See also

Rooke
Rookery (disambiguation)
Rookie (disambiguation)